Centered in Lima, Ohio, the Western Buckeye League is an OHSAA athletic league located in northwest Ohio and includes schools in Allen, Auglaize, Defiance, Hardin, Mercer, Putnam, and Van Wert counties. The league's school district boundaries also include portions of Logan, Paulding, Shelby, and Wyandot counties. The WBL originally formed in 1936 and is one of the oldest high school conferences in the state.
The Western Buckeye League currently awards championships in 13 Varsity sports: baseball, basketball, bowling, cross country, football, golf, soccer, softball, swimming, tennis, track, volleyball, and wrestling.  An academic bowl tournament for the schools in the league began annually in 2004.

While the WBL consists of larger schools and spreads over a larger area, it is geographically located in the same area of the state as the Midwest Athletic Conference. Most schools out of both leagues typically host hotly contested matchups in nearly every sport.

Current members

Former members

Membership history

1940s 
 The charter members of the league in 1940-1941 were Bellefontaine, Bluffton, Celina, St. Marys, Van Wert and Wapakoneta.
 Kenton entered the league in 1942.

1950s 
 Shawnee entered the league with the 1952-1953 Basketball Season.
 Bluffton left the league in football after the 1952 season.
 Bluffton left the league in all sports after the 1956–1957 season to join the Northwest Conference.
 Coldwater entered the league in the 1957–1958 season.

1960s 
 Bellefontaine left the league after the 1964–1965 season to join the Central Buckeye Conference.
 Bath entered the league beginning with the 1965-1966 Basketball Season.
 Shawnee left the league at the end of the 1966-1967 Basketball Season.
 Ottawa-Glandorf entered the league in the spring of 1967 after withdrawing from the Northwest Conference in football and Putnam County League in all other sports.

1970s 
 Elida and Delphos St. Johns entered the league in December 1971.
 Coldwater withdrew from the league effective June 1, 1973 to join the Midwest Athletic Conference.
 Defiance entered the league in September 1973 in all sports.  (Defiance 1972-73 WBL meets in CC, Golf, Tennis, and Track)

1980s 
 Delphos St. Johns withdrew from the league August 3, 1981 (effective end of 1981–82 season) to join the Midwest Athletic Conference.
 Shawnee re-entered the league on October 5, 1981. Played full schedule in 1982–1983.

2000s 
 In 2009, Napoleon decided they would leave the Greater Buckeye Conference for the Northern Lakes League and Sandusky decided they would join the Northern Ohio League. The GBC quickly dwindled down to four schools, leaving Findlay, Fremont Ross, Lima Senior, and Marion Harding out in the cold.
 On March 11, Lima Senior sent a letter to the WBL in hopes of expanding.
 On April 1, the WBL responded and denied Lima Senior entry into the league. The letter stated, "The Western Buckeye League (WBL) is not looking to expand at this time and there is no anticipation of any member leaving."

OHSAA state appearances

Boys League Championships

*The first cross country meet was an invitational in 1969, and not an official league meet.
~Two golf league matches were held during the 1973–74 school year, one in the fall and one in the spring.  Lima Bath won both matches.

Girls League Championships
 
*The 1983 and 1984 cross country league meets were invitationals and not official championships.  The first official league meet championship was in 1985.

All Sport Trophy winners
The Western Buckeye League awards an annual All Sport Trophy to the school that accumulates the most points in their rank in each of the conference sanctioned sports.

Enrollment

External links
 Western Buckeye League official website

References

Ohio high school sports conferences